Javed Ahmadi (born 2 January 1992) is an Afghan cricketer.  He is a right-handed batsman who bowls right-arm off break.  He currently represents the Afghanistan national cricket team. He was one of the eleven cricketers to play in Afghanistan's first Test match, against India, in June 2018.

Career
Ahmadi first represented Afghanistan in age group cricket, and was a member of the Afghanistan Under-19 cricket team which, for the first time in history, qualified for the 2010 ICC Under-19 Cricket World Cup in New Zealand. Ahmadi represented Afghanistan during the World Cup.

Ahmadi's senior debut came against Scotland in a warm-up match for the 2010 ICC World Cricket League Division One. During this tournament he made his debut in List-A cricket and also his debut in One Day International cricket against Scotland.  He played one further ODI during the tournament, which came against hosts the Netherlands.  To date he has played two further ODI's, both of which came against Scotland during Afghanistan's tour of Scotland in 2010. In his four ODIs to date, Ahmadi has scored 31 runs at a batting average of 10.33, with a high score of 25.  Meanwhile, in the field he has taken 2 catches.

Ahmadi's first-class debut came against Kenya in the 2009-10 ICC Intercontinental Cup.  During the match he made scores of 11 and 55, his maiden first-class half century.

In July 2018, he was the leading run-scorer for Amo Region in the 2018 Ghazi Amanullah Khan Regional One Day Tournament, with 267 runs in five matches.

In September 2018, he was named in Kabul's squad in the first edition of the Afghanistan Premier League tournament.

Test cricket
In May 2018, he was named in Afghanistan's squad for their inaugural Test match, played against India. He made his Test debut for Afghanistan, against India, on 14 June 2018. In February 2019, he was named in Afghanistan's Test squad for their one-off match against Ireland in India.

References

External links

1992 births
Living people
People from Kunduz Province
Afghan cricketers
Afghanistan Test cricketers
Afghanistan One Day International cricketers
Afghanistan Twenty20 International cricketers
Cricketers at the 2015 Cricket World Cup
Amo Sharks cricketers
Sportspeople from Kunduz
Kabul Zwanan cricketers